Eat a Bowl of Tea is a 1989 film directed by Wayne Wang based on the novel Eat a Bowl of Tea by Louis Chu.

It is a Chinese romantic film starring Cora Miao, Russell Wong, Victor Wong, Siu-Ming Lau and Eric Tsang.

Plot
The story begins with exposition of the difficult lives of the first generation of male Chinese-American immigrants who were not allowed to bring their wives and families with them into the United States due to the Chinese Exclusion Act. For decades, these immigrant men have not seen their families they had left back in China. Ben (Russell Wong) is the son of one these immigrants and has just finished serving in the U.S. Army during World War II. Due to the War Brides Act, Ben is allowed to bring a bride back from China, which he does after an arranged marriage. Mei Oi (Cora Miao), the bride, besides being attracted to Ben also wants to see her father who emigrated to the U.S. before she was born. As one of the early couples of child-bearing age within New York's Chinatown, Ben and Mei Oi have to deal with the expectations of the entire Chinatown community as well as his father (Victor Wong). However, the pressures on Ben render him impotent, and in her confusion over his seeming lack of interest, Mei Oi succumbs to the attentions of Ah Song (Eric Tsang). Their affair creates complications for their own marriage and for the reputations of their fathers in the close-knit "bachelor society" of Chinatown.

Cast
 Cora Miao as Mei Oi
 Russell Wong as Ben Loy
 Victor Wong as Wah Gay
 Siu-Ming Lau as Lee Gong
 Eric Tsang as Ah Song (as Eric Tsiang Chi Wai)
 Sau-Kei as Bok Fat (as Lee Sau Kee)
 Yuen Fat Fai as Letter Writer
 Fan Hui as Ben Loy's Mother (as Hui Fun)
 Lan Law as Aunt Gim
 Yuen-Yee Ng as Third Sister
 Wu Ming Yu as Mei Oi's Mother
 Ta Lei as Movie Translator (as Tat Lui)
 Wai Wong as Chuck Ting
 Philip Chan as Henry Wang
 Yu-Yung Teng as Fat Man (as Tang Shun Nin)
 Jessica Harper as American prostitute (uncredited)

Critical reception
Variety wrote "Wayne Wang returns to Chinatown with Eat a Bowl of Tea and recaptures the relaxed humor and deep emotions of his earlier Dim Sum in the process."

References

External links 
 
 

1989 films
1980s romance films
Films about Chinese Americans
Films based on American novels
Films directed by Wayne Wang
Films about immigration to the United States
Films set in 1949
Films set in the 1940s
Films set in New York City